Mario Manuel Cristobal (born September 24, 1970) is head football coach of the Miami Hurricanes football team at the University of Miami. Cristobal previously was the head football coach at Florida International University (FIU) from 2007 to 2012 and the University of Oregon from 2017 to 2021. He was an all-conference offensive tackle on the Miami Hurricanes football team that won national championships in 1989 and 1991. Cristobal is the first Cuban-American head coach in NCAA Division I college football history.

Playing career

High school and college
Cristobal played high school football at Christopher Columbus High School in Miami and then went to play for the University of Miami, where he was a four-year letterman between 1988 and 1992. Cristobal played under Hall of Fame coach Jimmy Johnson and Dennis Erickson during the rise of the University of Miami as one of the nation's elite collegiate football programs. During his four seasons at the University of Miami, he was a member of two national championship-winning teams (1989 and 1991). In 1992, Cristobal earned First-team All-Big East Conference as an offensive tackle. 

Cristobal graduated from the University of Miami in 1993 with a Bachelor of Business Administration degree from the University of Miami School of Business and later earned a master's degree there in 2001. Cristobal is one of several University of Miami players from the late 1980s who appears in the documentary The U, which premiered December 12, 2009 on ESPN, and chronicles the program's rapid ascent and national championships and the era's associated scandals that proved costly to it. The documentary drew 2.3 million viewers, making it then the most watched documentary in ESPN history.

Professional career
Following his collegiate career at the University of Miami, Cristobal signed a free agent contract with the Denver Broncos in 1994. He played for the Amsterdam Admirals of NFL Europe for two seasons, in 1995 and 1996, and then launched his collegiate coaching career.

Coaching career

Cristobal's coaching career began at the University of Miami where he served as a graduate assistant under head football coach Butch Davis from 1998 to 2000. From 2001 to 2003, Cristobal was the tight ends and offensive line coach at Rutgers University under Greg Schiano. He returned to Miami to serve as tight ends coach and offensive line coach under Larry Coker for three seasons from 2004 to 2006.

FIU
On December 19, 2006, Cristobal was named the second head coach in FIU's history. He also was the first Cuban-American head coach in Division I-A. Cristobal inherited a team with a winless record the previous season. He implemented a spread offense, and stated that he expected FIU to achieve success "faster than what we did at Rutgers", a process which "took five years".

FIU struggled for most of his first season as head coach, losing their first eleven games. However, on December 1, the Golden Panthers finally broke a Football Bowl Subdivision-leading 23-game losing skid with a 38–19 victory over North Texas.

His second season showed considerable signs of improvement. After three straight nonconference losses to Kansas, Iowa, and USF, the Golden Panthers under Cristobal pulled together an upset win against MAC opponent Toledo. The team used this momentum to build a three-game winning streak, defeating Sun Belt Conference opponents North Texas and MTSU before it continued on to finish with a 5–7 record. The team was two wins away from a bowl game before falling out of contention in the 2008 Shula Bowl against in-state rivals FAU in a 57–50 overtime loss, before finishing its season with a home victory over Western Kentucky.

The third season under Cristobal came with high expectations after winning five games the previous year. The team regressed under his leadership and took a step back going 3–9 overall, with wins coming against North Texas, Western Kentucky, and Louisiana-Lafayette. During the offseason recruiting period, Cristobal was able to secure FIU's first ESPN 150 player, Willis Wright, from nearby Miami Springs High, the same school that produced T. Y. Hilton.

After being predicted to finish sixth in the conference in the preseason by the Sun Belt Writers Association, Cristobal led his young Panthers team to their first Sun Belt Conference championship after four years at the helm. FIU, who had never had a winning season prior to the 2010 campaign, saw themselves atop the conference tied with Troy University who shared a similar 6–2 conference record. FIU did win their head-to-head matchup with Troy, 52–35. At the conclusion of the season FIU was selected to participate in their first bowl game, the Little Caesars Pizza Bowl. They won with a field goal in the closing seconds against Toledo, 34–32, after Toledo went for a two-point conversion to take the lead, 32–31. That win gave them a 7–6 record, their first ever winning record.

Cristobal carries a reputation of being an excellent recruiter, setting up for his third season at FIU by putting together an impressive recruiting class of 23 student athletes, at least 20 of them from Florida. He wears a customary shirt and tie along with dress pants for each and every game to honor his idol, Joe Paterno. He was also named the fittest coach currently in the FBS according to an ESPN blog to which he confirmed on The Dan Le Batard Show on May 29, 2009. As of the 2009 season Mario Cristobal has retired the "shirt-and-tie" look and has opted to wear traditional collared shirts during games.

On December 5, 2012, Cristobal was relieved of his position as head coach of the FIU football program. FIU Athletic Director Pete Garcia explained his reasoning for firing Cristobal as "He's done a very good job for this program, but we’ve gone backwards over the last year and a half. Over the last 22 games, we've gone 8-14." The decision by Garcia was heavily criticized as rash.

Alabama
After his dismissal as head coach at FIU, Cristobal was hired by Miami to serve as associate head coach and tight ends coach on January 10, 2013. Six weeks later, he was hired by Nick Saban to become Alabama's assistant head coach, offensive line coach, and recruiting coordinator.

Cristobal was an elite recruiter at Alabama, finishing No. 1 in the national 247Sports.com composite rankings in each of his four seasons. He was named the National Recruiter of the Year by 247Sports in the 2015 cycle and in 2016 he was ranked as the nation's No. 2 recruiter in the country by 247Sports.

Cristobal's Alabama offensive line was awarded as the nation's best in 2015, winning the inaugural Joe Moore Award given to the toughest, most physical line in the nation. His offensive line ranked in the top 25 nationally in sacks allowed in each of his first two seasons. Alabama's offensive lines produced standout players and NFL draft picks under Cristobal, including first-team All-American and 2015 first-round draft pick Ryan Kelly and 2014 freshman All-American Cam Robinson, who went on to win the Outland Trophy in Cristobal's final year with Alabama.

Oregon
In January 2017, Mario Cristobal joined Willie Taggart's staff at Oregon as offensive line coach, with additional duties as co-offensive coordinator (shared with quarterbacks coach Marcus Arroyo) and run game coordinator (along with running backs coach Donte Pimpleton). On December 5, 2017, he was given the title of interim head coach upon Willie Taggart's departure to Florida State; then, three days later, on Friday, December 8, 2017, Cristobal was officially announced as permanent head coach of the Ducks.

After Taggart's abrupt departure, Cristobal fielded a team in 2018 that improved to 9-4 and won the Redbox Bowl (formerly the San Francisco Bowl) against Michigan State.

In 2019, Cristobal was voted Pac-12 Coach of the Year by the Associated Press after going 11-2 during the regular season, winning the North division, beating Utah in the Conference Championship, and earning a trip to the Rose Bowl. That year, Cristobal and offensive line coach Alex Mirabal coached All-American Penei Sewell, who went on to win the Outland Trophy for best interior linemen in the country. The Oregon offensive line unit was a finalist for the 2019 Joe Moore Award for best overall group in the country. Oregon finished the post season with a Rose Bowl victory over the Wisconsin Badgers.

In 2020, Cristobal again led Oregon to a Pac-12 Championship, posting a 4–2 record against a conference-only schedule due to the COVID-19 pandemic.  Oregon would finish the season with a loss in the Fiesta Bowl to Iowa State.

Miami 

On December 6, 2021, Cristobal was named head coach of the University of Miami Hurricanes football team, replacing Manny Diaz. Cristobal signed a 10-year, $80 million contract with the Hurricanes.

Recruiting
Cristobal is known for his accomplishments and skills as recruiter of elite collegiate football prospects. During his four seasons at Alabama, the Crimson Tide finished with the top-ranked recruiting class in each year of Cristobal's involvement with the program. Cristobal was a key part of the Tide’s recruiting dominance as the primary recruiter for multiple 5-star recruits and future first round NFL draft picks. In 2015. Cristobal was named the top recruiter in the nation by 247Sports, ESPN, Rivals and Scout.

In 2017, Cristobal joined Willie Taggart’s staff at Oregon, where he helped the Ducks sign the 13th ranked recruiting class. After Taggart left Oregon for a  head coaching job at Florida State, Cristobal replaced him as head coach of Oregon. In his three years as head coach, Oregon signed the 8th, 12th and 6th ranked recruiting classes, which included #1 overall recruit and future #5 overall draft pick Kayvon Thibodeaux.

On December 6, 2021, Cristobal was named head coach at the University of Miami, his alma mater. Prior to commencement of the 2022 season, he was credited with a successful recruiting season that ranked as high as 16th nationally in independent assessment of the year's recruitment of high school football prospects. Among his recruitment successes was securing four of the top-ranked recruitment prospects of the year.

Personal life 
Cristobal and his wife, Jessica, were married in June 2006 and have two sons, Mario Mateo and Rocco.

After his football playing career ended, Cristobal went through a two-year application process to become a U.S. Secret Service agent and was offered a job in 1998. Then a first-year graduate assistant at the University of Miami, Cristobal said his goodbyes to fellow Hurricanes players but then abruptly changed his mind the following morning and chose instead to remain with collegiate football coaching.

Cristobal is a second-generation Cuban-American.

Head coaching record

References

External links
 Miami profile

1970 births
Living people
American football offensive tackles
Alabama Crimson Tide football coaches
Amsterdam Admirals players
Denver Broncos players
FIU Panthers football coaches
Miami Hurricanes football coaches
Miami Hurricanes football players
Oregon Ducks football coaches
Rutgers Scarlet Knights football coaches
Christopher Columbus High School (Miami-Dade County, Florida) alumni
Players of American football from Miami
Sports coaches from Miami
Coaches of American football from Florida
American expatriate sportspeople in the Netherlands
American sportspeople of Cuban descent
University of Miami Business School alumni